Charlotte Atkyns (née Walpole) (1757–1836) was an English actress and agent, foremost known for her attempts in rescuing the members of the former royal family of France from imprisonment during the French Revolution.

Life
She enjoyed a short career on the London stage as Charlotte Walpole in 1777–1779. She married in 1779 Edward Atkyns (1756–1794) of Ketteringham Hall, Norfolk. They moved to France by 1784.
 
After the outbreak of the French revolution, she was recruited as a spy and agent for the counterrevolutionary royalists by Louis de Frotté. Between 1791 and 1794, she was active as a spy in Paris. She became known for her attempts of trying to aid the members of the former royal family to escape from prison. In 1793, she made repeated attempts to try to help former queen Marie Antoinette on one occasion by visiting her in prison dressed as a national guard with the plan of changing clothes with her. She also tried to free the former royal children from the Temple.

References
 Marina Grey, Hébert : le père Duchesne, agent royaliste, Paris, Librairie académique Perrin, 1983.
 Nagel, Susan. Marie-Therese, Child of Terror: The Fate of Marie Antoinette's Daughter. NY: Bloomsbury, 2008.

Notes

1757 births
1836 deaths
18th-century spies
People of the French Revolution
18th-century English actresses
English emigrants to France